The Civic Revolutionary Movement (es: Movimiento Cívico Revolucionario) was an Argentine political party that was the successor of the Nationalist Liberation Alliance.

References 

Defunct political parties in Argentina
Political parties established in 1955
1955 establishments in Argentina
Right-wing parties in Argentina
Political parties with year of disestablishment missing